Brahma Dharma refer to Hindu denominations that revere Brahma as the supreme:

 Brahmo Samaj or Brahmoism a Bengali religious movement by Ram Mohan Roy
Brahmo Dharma, a Bengali religious book by Debendranath Tagore (c. 1848) 
Bodo Brahma Dharma religious movement of Kalicharan Brahma amongst Bodo people of Assam